This is a list of members of the Victorian Legislative Council between 1964 and 1967. As half of the Legislative Council's terms expired at each triennial election, half of these members were elected at the 1961 state election with terms expiring in 1967, while the other half were elected at the 1964 state election with terms expiring in 1970.

 On 30 August 1964, Bill Mair, Liberal MLC for South Eastern Province, died. Labor candidate Ian Cathie won the resulting by-election on 10 October 1964.
 On 10 August 1965, Sir Gordon McArthur, Liberal MLC for South Western Province, died. Liberal candidate Stan Gleeson won the resulting by-election on 18 September 1965.
 On 29 December 1966, Baron Snider, Liberal MLC for Higinbotham Province, died. Liberal candidate Murray Hamilton won the resulting by-election on 25 February 1967.

Sources
 Re-member (a database of all Victorian MPs since 1851). Parliament of Victoria.

Members of the Parliament of Victoria by term
20th-century Australian politicians